Opiona columbiana is a species of millipede in the family Caseyidae. It is found in North America.

References

Further reading

 

Chordeumatida
Articles created by Qbugbot
Animals described in 1951